Diana Ospina-Taylor (born July 4, 1979) is a former professional tennis player from the United States.

Biography
Ospina is the youngest of three children and only daughter of Luis Fernando and Maria. Her father is an endocrinologist and she was raised in Bloomfield Hills in metropolitan Detroit.

A right-handed player, she claimed her first ITF circuit title in Mexico City in 1997. Ospina won a total of five ITF singles tournaments during her career and was a regular in WTA Tour qualifiers, twice making the main draw. She qualified for the 2003 Kroger St. Jude International in Memphis and featured in the 2005 Challenge Bell in Quebec City as a lucky loser.

Since retiring she has worked as a tennis coach, most recently as a member of staff at Franklin Athletic Club. She has also been an assistant coach for the University of Detroit Mercy's tennis team.

ITF finals

Singles (5–1)

Doubles (1–0)

References

External links
 
 

1979 births
Living people
American female tennis players
Tennis people from Michigan
Sportspeople from Detroit
21st-century American women